Threitol is a four-carbon sugar alcohol with the molecular formula C4H10O4.  It is primarily used as an intermediate in the chemical synthesis of other compounds. It is the diastereomer of erythritol, which is used as a sugar substitute.

In living organisms, threitol is found in the edible fungus Armillaria mellea.
It serves as a cryoprotectant (antifreeze agent) in the Alaskan beetle Upis ceramboides.

See also
 Antifreeze protein
 Dithiothreitol, a thiol derivative of threitol

References

External links

Sugar alcohols
Tetroses
Tetrols